Balwearie High School is a non-denominational comprehensive secondary school at the west end of Kirkcaldy in Scotland. Balwearie serves around 1500 pupils aged from 11 to 18 and includes a Department of Additional Support (DAS for short) for children with Additional Support Needs.

History and facilities

The school was initially a junior secondary school, before becoming a comprehensive school in 1972.  It was designed by architect Gavin Haveron McConnell and, in 2014, received Listed status (Category B) from Historic Environment Scotland for being among the very best examples of school building of the post-war building period in Scotland, closely following Modernist design principles and marking a clear break from the more formal designs of the inter-war period and 1950s. It originally comprised two blocks, named C Block and T Block. The J block was added a few years later, housing a library and maths, geography, science, technical, and computing classrooms. This and the C Block is conjoined via a bridge corridor through the L (library) Block. There are also detached hut units housing a small number of classrooms. The school has two cafeterias – the L Block is used by first, second, and sixth year pupils; the C Block is used by third, fourth and fifth year pupils – as well as a breakfast club.

Sporting facilities include:
a wooden floored gymnasium with gymnastic equipment
a gym with weight training facilities
a swimming pool
an indoor games area
Two dance studios
Classroom for P.E
outdoor tennis courts
football/rugby pitch
400m running track
1 Blaes hockey pitch
1 astroturf pitch

There is also an auditorium with a stage area, with a full set of lighting and sound equipment. This was designed and created by the Art & Design Department & Farmer Facilities.

Outside school hours, the school functions as a community centre.

In January 1997, a radiator fault caused a fire in the school's music department, which is situated at the top floor of the C block. The fire began in the early hours of the morning following the school's 'Burns Night' celebrations. It was extinguished rapidly by the local fire brigade. The music department suffered the most through fire and water damages; however, each level beneath the third floor suffered fire damage as well. The school was closed for several days with students being allowed back in stages, with the senior students, who were in the final preparations for May exams, returning first.

There was a second fire on 29 June 2009 in the Games Hall and community use cafe shortly before 5pm; the damaged building was deemed safe, and the awards ceremony due that evening went ahead as planned. Pupils attended school the following day as usual.

Houses

Current houses 
The houses at Balwearie are named after various farms located on the outskirts of Kirkcaldy.

Former houses

Rectors of Balwearie High School

Catchment area
The school's catchment area covers much of the south and west of Kirkcaldy, as well as Kinghorn, Burntisland and Auchtertool. Balwearie's associated primary schools are Auchtertool, Burntisland, Dunnikier, Kinghorn, Strathallan and Kirkcaldy West.

Curriculum

A high staying on rate is reflected in large numbers gaining employment, training or Further or Higher Education.

The school originally won a Charter Mark Award for excellence in public service in 2001, this has now been renewed. The school also has the Schools Curriculum Award.

Balwearie is known for having a large sciences department as well as a STEM programme started by former rector Dr James More which involves 6th year sciences students visiting catchment primary schools to encourage future Balwearie pupils to take an interest in science.

Recently pupils in an Alternative Curriculum Group won a Fife Excellence Award and the magazine club won the Scotsman/Royal Bank of Scotland 'Design a Newspaper'. More recently, a Young Enterprise company in the school scooped two of the three trophies.

The school is also part of the Erasmus Programme, going on over the two sessions of 2015/16 and 2016/17.

School Board and Parent Council
Balwearie is supported by a School Board and a Parent Council – the Balwearie High School Association. The Balwearie High School Association provides volunteers for many of the school's social events, including the biennial School Musical.

Notable former pupils

Colin Cameron, footballer
Stephen Dick, hockey player who represented Great Britain in the Beijing Olympics
Murray Douglas, professional rugby player, Brumbies
Sharon Small, actress
Lewis Stevenson, footballer
David Torrance, Scottish National Party MSP

Motto
The school's motto is "To Strive, to Seek", taken from the final line of Tennyson's Ulysses. The line ends "...to find, and not to yield."

HMIe inspection
In February 2008 the school underwent an inspection by Her Majesty's Inspectorate of Education (HMIE).

In October/November 2017, a team of inspectors from Education Scotland visited Balwearie High School.

References

External links
Official Website
Balwearie High School on FifeDirect

Secondary schools in Fife
Kirkcaldy
Educational institutions established in 1964
1964 establishments in Scotland